Dominik Tomczyk (born April 15, 1974) is a Polish former professional basketball player. He is known as one of the all-time greats in Polish basketball. He was selected to the All-EuroBasket Team in 1997, as the Polish national team finished seventh.

Honours
Club career
 3× Polish Basketball League champion (1996, 2001, 2002)
 2× Polish Cup (1989, 1990, 1992, 1997, 2004, 2005)

Individual awards
 2× PLK Most Valuable Player (1996, 2002)
 Polish League Finals MVP (1998)

External links
 FIBA.com profile

1974 births
Living people
Forwards (basketball)
Polish men's basketball players
Śląsk Wrocław basketball players
Sportspeople from Wrocław
Turów Zgorzelec players